Stenotabanus psammophilus is a species of horse flies in the family Tabanidae.

Distribution
United States.

References

Tabanidae
Taxa named by Carl Robert Osten-Sacken
Diptera of North America
Insects described in 1876